Acrochaeta is a genus of flies in the family Stratiomyidae.

Species
Acrochaeta adusta Lindner, 1949
Acrochaeta asapha Fachin & Amorim, 2015
Acrochaeta balbii Fachin & Amorim, 2015
Acrochaeta convexifrons (McFadden, 1971)
Acrochaeta dichrostyla Fachin & Amorim, 2015
Acrochaeta dimidiata Lindner, 1949
Acrochaeta fasciata Wiedemann, 1830
Acrochaeta mexicana Lindner, 1949
Acrochaeta polychaeta Fachin & Amorim, 2015
Acrochaeta pseudofasciata Fachin & Amorim, 2015
Acrochaeta pseudopolychaeta Fachin & Amorim, 2015
Acrochaeta rhombostyla Fachin & Amorim, 2015
Acrochaeta ruscfhii Fachin & Amorim, 2015
Acrochaeta stigmata Fachin & Amorim, 2015

References

Stratiomyidae
Brachycera genera
Taxa named by Christian Rudolph Wilhelm Wiedemann
Diptera of North America
Diptera of South America